Trail End, also known as the John B. Kendrick Mansion, is a historic home located at 400 Clarendon Avenue in Sheridan, Wyoming. The home was built and inhabited by Wyoming governor and U.S. Senator John B. Kendrick. Built from 1908 to 1913, the house was designed by Glenn Charles MacAlister and cost $164,000. Kendrick was a successful cattleman when he commissioned the house, and he was only beginning his political career; once he became governor in 1914 and a senator three years later, Trail End became his summer home. The house is typical of homes built by prosperous Wyoming cattlemen in the early 20th century. It was added to the National Register of Historic Places on February 26, 1970.

The Sheridan County Historical Society purchased Trail End in 1969, saving it from threatened destruction and subsequently opening it to the public as a community museum. The state took over ownership in 1982.

References

Further reading
 Georgen, Cynde A.  In the shadow of the Bighorns:  A history of early Sheridan and the Goose Creek valley of northern Wyoming.  Sheridan, Wyoming:  Sheridan County Historical Society, 2010.  
 Georgen, Cynde A.  One cowboy's dream:  John B. Kendrick, his family, home, and ranching empire.  2nd edition, revised.  Virginia Beach, Virginia:  The Donning Company Publishers, 2004.

External links
Trail End State Historic Site
Trail End State Historic Site Wyoming State Parks, Historic Sites & Trails

Houses on the National Register of Historic Places in Wyoming
Houses completed in 1913
Houses in Sheridan County, Wyoming
1913 establishments in Wyoming
Museums in Sheridan County, Wyoming
Historic house museums in Wyoming
Wyoming state historic sites
National Register of Historic Places in Sheridan County, Wyoming
Sheridan, Wyoming
IUCN Category III